John Clopton (February 7, 1756 – September 11, 1816) was a United States representative from Virginia.

Early life and education
John Clopton was born in St. Peter's Parish, near Tunstall, New Kent County in the Colony of Virginia on February 7, 1756. His father was William Clopton (1618–1698) and his mother was Elizabeth Dorrell Ford (1727–1785). He graduated from the College of Philadelphia (now the University of Pennsylvania) in 1776. He studied law, was admitted to the bar and practiced.

Military service
He served as first lieutenant and as captain in the Virginia militia during the American Revolutionary War and was wounded at the Battle of Brandywine.

Career
Clopton was a member of the Virginia House of Delegates from 1789 to 1791 and was elected as a Democratic-Republican to the Fourth and Fifth Congresses, serving from March 4, 1795, to March 3, 1799. He was a member of the Virginia Privy Council from 1799 to 1801, and was elected to the Seventh and to the seven succeeding Congresses; during the Tenth Congress, he was chairman of the Committee on Revisal and Unfinished Business.

Clopton was a leading proponent of strict constructionist views in the House, standing as one of the few representatives who opposed the Second Bank of the United States on constitutional grounds. He served from March 4, 1801, until his death near Tunstall on September 11, 1816; interment was in the family burying ground on his plantation. Future President John Tyler was elected to fill the vacancy caused by Clopton's death.

Personal life
He married Sarah Bacon on May 15, 1784, daughter of Edmund Bacon and Elizabeth Edloe. They had several children: Izard (1785–?), Maria L. Adelaide (1788–?), John Bacon (1789–1860), William Edmund (1791–1848), and Sarah Elizabeth (1804–1843).

See also
List of United States Congress members who died in office (1790–1899)

References

1756 births
1816 deaths
University of Pennsylvania alumni
Members of the Virginia House of Delegates
Virginia militiamen in the American Revolution
Virginia lawyers
People from New Kent County, Virginia
Democratic-Republican Party members of the United States House of Representatives from Virginia
19th-century American lawyers